The Sigua River is a river in the United States territory of Guam. It empties into the Pago River.

See also
List of rivers of Guam

References

Rivers of Guam